Marmara opuntiella is a moth of the family Gracillariidae. It is known from Texas in the United States and from Mexico.  There are records of similar larvae with identical habits from Colombia, Cuba, Ecuador, El Salvador, Guatemala, Haiti, Honduras, Peru and Venezuela, and these may also refer to this species.

The larvae feed on Nopalea and Opuntia species. They mine the leaves of their host plant. The mine has the form of a long winding serpentine mine just under the epidermis, sometimes widened out into irregular blotches

References

External links
Marmara at microleps.org

Gracillariinae
Moths described in 1907